"Every Day My Mother's Voice" is a song by Australian recording artists Paul Kelly and Dan Sultan. The song was released on 3 May 2019, and recorded for The Final Quarter; a 2019 Australian documentary about the final stages of the Australian football career of Adam Goodes, during which he was the target of repeated booing by opposition fans and his relationship with his mother Lisa-May Sansbury.
 
The documentary director and producer Ian Darling told Music Feeds, "I've always loved the way Paul writes ballads and when I asked him to write a new song for Adam, I knew he would do it in his own original way… Paul wrote the song specifically with Dan Sultan in mind to perform it with him, which made it even more perfect."
 
At the 2019 Screen Music Awards in November 2019, the song won Best Original Song Composed for the Screen. At the APRA Music Awards of 2020, the song was shortlisted for Song of the Year.

The song is included in Kelly's greatest hits album, Songs from the South: 1985–2019.

Music video
The music video, directed and produced by Ian Darling, was released on 2 May and features Kelly and Sultan performing the track, with intermittent footage and sound bites of Adam Goodes' on and off-field triumphs.

Reception
Dan Condon from ABC said "From the moment those chiming guitars and Kelly's iconic voice ring out in the first few seconds, it just feels like we're in really safe hands. Of course Sultan, who is perhaps the best rock vocalist in the country right now, only adds value to this. He and Kelly sound brilliant together."

Release history

References

 

 

2019 songs
2019 singles
Paul Kelly (Australian musician) songs
Songs written by Paul Kelly (Australian musician)
Songs about Australia
Australian rules football culture
Australian rules football songs
Songs against racism and xenophobia
Indigenous Australian sport
Male vocal duets
Universal Music Australia singles